Benson is a city in Cochise County, Arizona, United States,  east-southeast of Tucson. It was founded as a rail terminal for the area, and still serves as such. As of the 2010 census, the population of the city was 5,105.

History
The city was founded in 1880 when the Southern Pacific Railroad came through. It was named after Judge William S. Benson, a friend of Charles Crocker, president of the Southern Pacific. The railroad, coming overland from California, chose the Benson site to cross the San Pedro River. Benson then served as a rail junction point to obtain ore and refined metal by wagon, in turn shipping rail freight back to the mines at Tombstone, Fairbank, Contention City and Bisbee.

The railhead in Benson was founded about a mile from a traditional crossing of the upper San Pedro River (known also as the Middle Crossing), used by the Southern Emigrant Trail and San Antonio-San Diego Mail Line.  It was the site of the San Pedro Station of the Butterfield Overland Mail and a wagon depot, the San Pedro River Station, run since 1871 by William Ohnesorgen.  In 1878 he had erected a toll bridge over which mining supplies were transported to the new mining camps such as Fairbank and Tombstone. Two years later this bridge marked the location of the railroad bridge that became the terminal site of Benson.

Apache Nitrogen Products (originally Apache Powder Company) was formed in the 1920s. It was located just outside Benson and was a major employer. Apache Park and nine nearby houses on West 6th Street in Benson, built to house company management, were listed on the National Register of Historic Places in 1994 as the Apache Powder Historic Residential District.

The city today is perhaps best known as the gateway to Kartchner Caverns State Park. It is also home to the acclaimed Singing Wind Bookshop, which specializes in books about the Southwest.

Geography

Climate
Similar to other desert plains areas of Arizona, Benson receives little rainfall and is relatively hot. Some snow occasionally falls in the winter. There is a high degree of diurnal temperature variation, especially in transitional months such as October.

Demographics

Benson first appeared on the 1890 U.S. Census as an unincorporated village. It did not appear on the 1900 census. It reappeared again in 1910. It did not return separately (as a village) in 1920, but the population for the Benson Precinct of Cochise County (825) was substituted (which included the village of Benson and adjacent area). It formally incorporated as a town in 1924 and has returned on every census since 1930. On March 26, 1985, voters approved a resolution upgrading Benson to city status.

As of the census of 2000, there were 4,711 people, 2,084 households, and 1,346 families residing in the city. The racial makeup of the city was 89.3% White or European American, 1.3% Native American, 0.7% Black or African American, 0.5% Asian, 0.1% Pacific Islander, 5.7% from other races, and 2.4% from two or more races. Hispanic or Latino people of any race were 19.9% of the population.

There were 2,084 households, out of which 18.9% had children under the age of 18 living with them, 51.5% were married couples living together, 9.2% had a female householder with no husband present, and 35.4% were non-families. 30.0% of all households were made up of individuals, and 17.4% had someone living alone who was 65 years of age or older.  The average household size was 2.22 and the average family size was 2.72.

In the city, the population was 19.5% under the age of 18, 6.7% from 18 to 24, 18.0% from 25 to 44, 26.5% from 45 to 64, and 29.3% who were 65 years of age or older.  The median age was 50 years. For every 100 females, there were 95.7 males. For every 100 females age 18 and over, there were 91.9 males.

The median income for a household in the city was $28,289, and the median income for a family was $36,364. Males had a median income of $34,013 versus $18,964 for females. The per capita income for the city was $17,315. About 6.2% of families and 13.7% of the population were below the poverty line, including 26.1% of those under age 18 and 9.9% of those age 65 or over.

Education

The World University is located in Benson.

The Benson Unified School District is a K-12 public school serving the Benson area. Their mascot is the Benson Bobcat.

Cochise College has a branch located on Route 90.

Infrastructure

Transportation

Interstate 10 serves the city with four exits; the highway leads northwest  to Tucson and northeast  to Willcox. Arizona State Route 80 leads southeast  to Tombstone, and Arizona State Route 90 leads south  to Sierra Vista.

Amtrak provides passenger rail service at 105 E. 4th Street, where it serves as a stop for the Sunset Limited and Texas Eagle lines (as of 2021). Freight railroads serving Benson are the Union Pacific Railroad and the San Pedro and Southwestern Railroad. Benson is also served by Greyhound between Phoenix and El Paso or Sierra Vista.

Benson Area Transit (BAT) is a bus service that covers Benson, St. David, Pomerene and Mescal.

Notable people
 Baxter Black, cowboy, poet, philosopher and former large-animal veterinarian
 Chad Curtis, former professional baseball player convicted of sexual assault
 Nick Gomez, actor
 Harry Partch, composer, music theorist, and creator of musical instruments
 Nick Ramus, actor
 Jack Speiden, stockbroker and ranch owner
 Chuck Stevenson, racecar driver

In popular culture
 This city was one of the filming locations for Paramount's 1994 film Pontiac Moon.
 "Benson, Arizona" is the name of the theme song to the 1974 movie Dark Star. Dark Star Road in Benson is named in honor of the film.
 In a tip of the hat to Dark Star, the Avengers crossover story Operation: Galactic Storm, which is about a war between alien races, commences here.
 The Spiritual Conference for Radical Fairies was held August 31–2 September 2, 1979, at the Sri Ram Ashram in Benson, the foundational event that began the Radical Faeries community.
 Rage, with George C. Scott, was filmed at the then-new Benson Hospital which had opened two years prior on July, 4th 1970.
 "Benson Hedges" by the American band Fun, references the lead singer and his existential crisis in Benson.
 This city was one of the filming locations for the 2005 film Miracle at Sage Creek.
 Jefferson, one of the characters in Season 8 of the Spanish TV Series Amar es para siempre, comes from Benson, Arizona.
Mentioned in the Lars Eighner book, Travels with Lizbeth

See also
 San Pedro Valley Observatory

References

External links

 City of Benson official website

 
Cities in Arizona
Populated places established in 1880
Cities in Cochise County, Arizona
Cochise County conflict
1880 establishments in Arizona Territory